Getoar is an Albanian given name for males. It is composed of the first two letters of Albanian subethnic divisions. 
 GE stands for Gheg living in the north of Albanian lands (Northern Albania) and speaking the Gheg Dialect.
 TO for Tosk living in the south and speaking the Tosk Dialect
 AR for Arbëresh, Albanians living in Italy, Greece etc. and speaking varieties of Albanian like Arbëresh and Arvanitika.

Notable people bearing this name include:

 Getoar Selimi, member of the rap group "Tingulli 3nt" and head of "Baba Records"
 Getoar Mjeku, Kosovar Albanian lawyer, writer and politician

References

Albanian masculine given names